Nikolay Semyonovich Epshtein (27 December 1919 – 27 August 2005) was a Soviet ice hockey coach.

Biography
Epshtein, who was Jewish, was born in Kolomna, Russian FSFR. He coached from 1953 to 1975 in the Soviet National League as head coach of Chimik in Voskresensk. He was also head coach of the Soviet Union national ice hockey team and the Soviet Junior National Team that won a European Championship.

He was inducted into the International Jewish Sports Hall of Fame in 2001. He was an inaugural inductee to the Russian Ice Hockey Hall of Fame in 2005. He died from Alzheimers in 2005.

See also
List of select Jewish coaches

References

External links
International Jewish Sports Hall of Fame bio

1919 births
2005 deaths
Jewish ice hockey players
People from Kolomna
Russian Jews
Soviet ice hockey coaches
Soviet Jews